Anna Maulidah Valerian Komu (born 15 January 1950 in Zanzibar) is a Tanzanian politician. She was a member of Tanzania's ruling party Chama Cha Mapinduzi (CCM) until the introduction of multiparty politics in Tanzania. She is now a member of Chama cha Demokrasia na Maendeleo (CHADEMA).

She was Freeman Mbowe's running mate in the 2005 Tanzania presidential election. Their party lost to CCM. She is now the Shadow Minister for Community Development, Gender and Children.

References

Zanzibari politicians
Living people
1950 births
Chadema politicians
21st-century Tanzanian women politicians